Houmam Al Sayed (born 1981) is a Syrian contemporary painter and sculptor.

Biography

Born in Damascus, Syria in 1981, Houmam Al Sayed is a contemporary Syrian artist. After studying sculpture, Al Sayed oriented his work to large-scale figurative paintings.

Houmam Al Sayed graduated from the Sculpture Department of the Institute of Applied Arts in Damascus in 2003. He began exhibiting his work at a young age. In 1998 he participated in an exhibition of painting at Teshrin University in Lattakia while he was seventeen years old. Since then, he has exhibited throughout Syria and has participated in group shows and Symposiums in the Arab world and Europe.

Work

Al Sayed works across various media, including painting, drawing, and sculpture.
 
Sayed's work is characterized by one figure – a stooped male man with a distorted face, bulbous nose, and wide-set eyes arrayed beneath a ubiquitous cloth cap.

The figures in al-Sayed's paintings, drawings and sculptures are swollen and misshapen. The crumpled and crushed characters symbolize the widespread public oppression throughout the Middle East, from military rule in Egypt to war-torn Iraq and Syria. As critic Edward Shalda says on the artist's website, ‘Houmam paints unknown people belonging to a known reality.’

Art critic Marie Tomb, in one of al-Sayed's exhibitions catalog, wrote: “In Houmam al-Sayed’s paintings, it is neither a man, nor an ideology, but a nameless and faceless structure whose countless metamorphoses reemerge anywhere they find detractors to silence and abuse citizens.” She continues: “His characters propose a version of what one might be reduced to when the pressure of religion, the state, and ideology is too much to bear.”

Selected exhibitions and symposiums

Al Sayed work was shown in various solo and group expositions.

 2017:          British Museum, London
 2017:            Atasi Foundation, Dubai
 2016:            Agial Art Gallery, Beirut
 2014:            BOX Freiraum, Berlin
 2014:            Mark Hachem Gallery, Beirut
 2013:            Mark Hachem Gallery, Paris
 2013:            White Box Projects, New York
 2011:            Showcase Gallery, Dubai

References

Sources

Agial Art Gallery

Middle-East Eye

The Daily Star

External links
  Christie's profile
  Artnet profile

1981 births
Syrian sculptors
Syrian painters
Living people